The Albatros D.I was a German fighter aircraft used during World War I. Although its operational career was short, it was the first of the Albatros D types which equipped the bulk of the German and Austrian fighter squadrons (Jagdstaffeln) for the last two years of the war.

Design and development
The D.I was designed by Robert Thelen, R. Schubert and Gnädig, as an answer to the latest Allied fighters, such as the Nieuport 11 Bébé and the Airco D.H.2, which had proved superior to the Fokker Eindecker and other early German fighters, and established a general Allied air superiority. It was ordered in June 1916 and introduced into squadron service that August.

The D.I had a semi-monocoque plywood fuselage, consisting of a single-layered outer shell, supported by a minimal internal structure. This was lighter and stronger than the fabric-skinned box-type fuselage then in common use, as well being easier to give an aerodynamically clean shape. At the same time its panelled-plywood skinning, done with mostly four-sided panels of thin plywood over the entire minimal fuselage structure, was less labour-intensive (and therefore less costly to manufacture) than a "true" monocoque structure. The Albatros D.I was powered by either a  Benz Bz.III or a  Mercedes D.III six-cylinder water cooled inline engine. The additional power of the Mercedes (Daimler) engine enabled twin fixed Spandau machine-guns to be fitted without any loss in performance.

The D.I had a relatively high wing loading for its time, and was not particularly manoeuvrable. This was compensated by its superior speed and firepower and it quickly proved the best all-round fighter available.

Operational history
A total of 50 pre-series and series D.I aircraft were in service by November 1916, replacing the early Fokker and Halberstadt D types, giving real "teeth" to the Luftstreitkräfte's new Jagdstaffeln (fighter squadrons). Further production of D.Is was not undertaken, however; instead, a reduction in the gap between the upper and lower wing in order to improve the pilot's forward and upward vision resulted in the otherwise identical Albatros D.II, which became Albatros' first major production fighter.

Operators

Luftstreitkräfte

Specifications (D.I with Benz engine)

See also

References

Notes

Bibliography
 Cheesman, E.F. Fighter Aircraft of the 1914-1918 War. London: Harleyford Publications, 1960.
 Gray, Peter and Owen Thetford. German Aircraft of the First World War (2nd ed.). London: Putnam, 1970. .
 Grosz, Peter M. "The Agile & Aggressive Albatros". Air Enthusiast Quarterly, No. 1, n.d., pp. 36–51.  
 Munson, Kenneth. Fighters, Attack and Training Aircraft 1914-1919 War. London: Blandford Press, 1968.
 Taylor, John W.R. Combat Aircraft of the World from 1909 to the Present. New York: G.P. Putnam's Sons, 1969. .
 Wagner, Ray and Heinz J. Nowarra. German Combat Planes: A Comprehensive Survey and History of the Development of German Military Aircraft from 1914 to 1945. Garden City, New York: Doubleday, 1971.

Biplanes
Single-engined tractor aircraft
1910s German fighter aircraft
Military aircraft of World War I
D.01
Aircraft first flown in 1916